CSK VVS Samara was a Russian women's football club from Samara. Founded in 1988 in the Kazakh SSR, it took part in the two editions of the Soviet championship as SKA Almaty, but following the collapse of the Soviet Union it was relocated to Togliatti and then Samara.

CSK VVS was one of the most successful teams in the new Russian women's football championship, winning three titles between 1993 and 1996, and a fourth one in 2001. The team made its European debut the following year, but it was disbanded in 2004.

Honours

Titles
 4 Russian Leagues (1993, 1994, 1996, 2001)
 1 Russian Cup (1994)

Other results
 For a detailed international record see Russian women's football clubs in international football

Record in UEFA competitions

Former internationals

  Alexandra Svetlitskaia
  Anastasia Kostyukova
  Anastasia Pozdeeva
  Elena Fomina
  Irina Grigorieva
  Elvira Todua
  Larisa Savina
  Maria Dyatchkova
  Marina Kolomiets
  Nadezhda Kharchenko
  Olga Kremleva
  Olga Vasilyeva
  Svetlana Petko
  Tatiana Egorova
  Veronika Shulga

References

See also

Women's football clubs in Russia
Association football clubs established in 1988
Sport in Samara, Russia
1988 establishments in Russia
2004 disestablishments in Russia
Association football clubs disestablished in 2004
Defunct football clubs in Russia